The Tango Saloon is an Australian experimental tango band from Sydney, Australia. Their self-titled debut, a "tango-flavored album with a twist of spaghetti western", was released in 2006 by Ipecac Recordings, the American record label run by Mike Patton and Greg Werckman. It was described by Greg Prato of AllMusic (All Music Guide) as "a musical breath of fresh air in the often foul-smelling state of modern popular music". Three albums have followed, Transylvania (2008), Shadows & Fog (2012) and Suspicion (2015) featuring vocalist Elana Stone. In June 2007, the band was seen supporting Ipecac label-mates Peeping Tom on the East-coast leg of their Australian tour. Other notable performances include support for Mondo Cane at Sydney Festival 2012, and for Marc Ribot in 2015 (with The Mango Balloon).

Band members
The Tango Saloon's lineup includes a number of notable musicians, including drummer Danny Heifetz from Mr. Bungle and Secret Chiefs 3. Bandleader Julian Curwin plays on occasion in Monsieur Camembert, along with accordionist Marcello Maio and double bassist Mark Harris. Band members' other projects include Darth Vegas, Hermitude, Marsala and The Fantastic Terrific Munkle. Transylvania also features a guest vocal from Mike Patton on the track Dracula Cha Cha.

The list of members:

Live band:
 Julian Curwin – guitar, keyboards
 Marcello Maio – accordion, keyboards
 Sam Golding – tuba, trumpet
 John Hibbard – trombone
 Mark Harris – double bass
 Danny Heifetz – drums, percussion
 Jess Ciampa – percussion
 Elana Stone – vocals

Other musicians/guests:
 Shenton Gregory – violin, viola
 Christian Watson – alto & baritone sax
 Leonie Cohen – piano
 Svetlana Bunic – accordion
 Alon Ilsar – drums, electronics
 Luke Dubber – keyboards
 Martin Kay – clarinets
 Reuben Derrick – tenor sax
 Kory Horwood – double bass
 Jane Sheldon – vocals
 Brian Campeau – vocals
 Ilan Kidron – vocals
 Mike Patton – vocals

Other activities
In 2010, band leader Julian Curwin developed a stripped-back chamber version of The Tango Saloon, named The Mango Balloon, with a lighter sound adding lounge, exotica and continental jazz to the larger band’s tango/western blend. Aside from six members from The Tango Saloon, the recordings also feature special guests, bringing their own distinct flavour to the music - The Mango Balloon: Volume 1 (2010) with Eddie Bronson, Volume 2 (2012) with Brian Campeau, Volume 3 (2014) with Shenton Gregory, and Volume 4 (2017) with Matt McMahon. He also released Crossing (2018) with Jane Sheldon, and Midnight Lullaby (2020) with Stu Hunter, Lloyd Swanton and Jess Ciampa.

Discography

Studio albums

References

External links
 The Tango Saloon official website
 Romero Records
 The Tango Saloon at Ipecac Recordings
 The Mango Balloon at Rufus Records

New South Wales musical groups
Tango musicians
Tango music groups
Ipecac Recordings artists